Calang (Jawoë: چالڠ), the capital of the Aceh Jaya Regency of the special territory (daerah istimewa) of Aceh was on the island of Sumatra, Indonesia. It had a population of about 12,000 though it was reported to have "vanished completely leaving only scattered shards of concrete" as a result of the tsunami produced by the 2004 Indian Ocean earthquake. Only about 30 per cent of the townspeople have survived.

The trail of destruction left by the tsunami extends two kilometers inland from the coast. Whole hills have been washed away.

The township, a former Indonesian Military (TNI, Tentara Nasional Indonesia) stronghold, will be relocated inland according to Indonesian Welfare Minister Alwi Shihab.

Climate
Calang has a tropical rainforest climate (Af) with heavy to very heavy rainfall year-round.

See also 
 Gleebruk
 Teunom
 Meulaboh
 Tapaktuan

References 

 Only 30% of the Residents of Calang are Left

External links 

 Leuser International Foundation

Populated places in Aceh
Regency seats of Aceh